is a Japanese figure skater who competes in ladies' singles. She has won silver medals on the senior international level at the 2014 Cup of Nice, 2014 Gardena Spring Trophy, and 2013 Triglav Trophy.

Career 
Oba started skating at age 10. 

Oba made her international debut at the 2010 Cup of Nice. Competing on the senior level, she finished 7th. After winning the bronze medal at the 2010–11 Japanese Junior Championships, she was assigned to the 2011 World Junior Championships, where she finished 8th. The following season, she received her first ISU Junior Grand Prix assignment.

In the 2012–13 season, Oba won her first JGP medal, silver, competing at an event in Germany and placed 4th in her other JGP assignment in Turkey. Nationally, Oba placed 6th on the junior level and 11th as a senior. She ended her season with her first senior international medal, also silver, at the 2013 Triglav Trophy.

In the 2013–14 Junior Grand Prix, Oba placed 7th in Poland and then won a bronze medal in Estonia. She ended her season with another senior international silver medal at the 2014 Gardena Spring Trophy.

In the 2014–15 season, Oba made her senior Grand Prix debut at the Rostelecom Cup, where she placed 6th with a personal best free skate and total score.

Programs

Competitive highlights 
GP: Grand Prix; CS: Challenger Series; JGP: Junior Grand Prix

References

External links 
 

1995 births
Living people
Japanese female single skaters
People from Tokoname
Sportspeople from Aichi Prefecture
Competitors at the 2015 Winter Universiade